Very Bad Deaths (Baen Books, 2004), is a science-fiction/suspense-mystery novel from Canadian science fiction author Spider Robinson. The book was followed in 2008 by a sequel, Very Hard Choices. It explores the personal implications of uncontrolled telepathy, social responsibility, and the idea of evolutionary, biological evil, while expounding on Spider's own political and social views.

Summary
What do you do, if you have iron-clad knowledge of a planned homicide of incredible depravity and cruelty, but have no evidence that would convince anyone "in authority"? This is the problem that faces Zandor "Smelly" Zudenigo, a telepath and hermit living on an island off Vancouver, British Columbia, Canada, when fate causes a serial killer to overfly his island, while thinking about his next planned multiple-murder. What can he do, especially since Zandor is incapable of turning his telepathy off, and exposure to other minds is excruciatingly painful?

Unable to deal with the thoughts or presence of most other human beings, Zandor turns to an old acquaintance, the book's narrator, Russell Walker: a depressed, reclusive, national newspaper columnist trying to deal with the death of his wife, and teetering on the edge of suicide. After explaining the situation, and dealing with Walker's depression, the two of them try to find a way to stop the crime from occurring. But how can they convince anyone? They cannot explain how the knowledge was obtained. They are not likely to be believed, and if they were, how long would Zandor stay out of the clutches of the intelligence agencies? Besides, Zandor only knows what the killer was thinking at the time, and how often do we happen to conveniently and consciously think of our full name and address?

Finally able to convince a single member of the Vancouver Police Department, constable Nika Mandic, the three of them try to track down the mysterious "Allen", while wrestling with the practical and moral implications of what to do about him once they find him.

Very Bad Deaths is a collection of interrelated and interwoven short stories, each telling part of a longer narrative in discrete slices of time.

Sequel
The sequel to this book, Very Hard Choices, was released in 2008.  The author read excerpts from this book in his "Spider on the Web" podcast.

External links
 Spider Robinson's official web site
 Spider Robinson reads Very Bad Deaths (excerpt)

2004 science fiction novels
2004 American novels
American science fiction novels
Canadian science fiction novels
Novels set in Vancouver
2004 speculative fiction novels